Kecksies and Other Twilight Tales is a collection of stories by British writer Marjorie Bowen. It was released in 1976 and was the author's first collection of stories published in the United States.  It was published by Arkham House in an edition of 4,391 copies.

Contents

Kecksies and Other Twilight Tales contains the following stories:

 "Preface"
 "The Hidden Ape"
 "Kecksies"
 "Raw Material"
 "The Avenging of Ann Leete"
 "The Crown Derby Plate"
 "The Sign-Painter and the Crystal Fishes"
 "Scoured Silk"
 "The Breakdown"
 "One Remained Behind"
 "The House by the Poppy Field"
 "Florence Flannery"
 "Half-Past Two"

Sources

1976 short story collections
Horror short story collections
Fantasy short story collections